Lorenzo Priuli (1489 – 17 August 1559) was the 82nd Doge of Venice.  Born a member of the Priuli family, he reigned from 1556 to 1559. His dogaressa was Zilia Dandolo (d. 1566).

References

1489 births
1559 deaths
16th-century Doges of Venice
Lorenzo